Radiographic systems to classify osteoarthritis vary by which joint is being investigated. In osteoarthritis, the choice of treatment is based on pain and decreased function, but radiography can be useful before surgery in order to prepare for the procedure.

Vertebral column
There are many grading systems for degeneration of intervertebral discs and facet joints in the cervical and lumbar vertebrae, of which the following radiographic systems can be recommended in terms of interobserver reliability:
Kellgren grading of cervical disc degeneration
Kellgren grading of cervical facet joint degeneration
Lane grading of lumbar disc degeneration
Thompson grading of lumbar disc degeneration (by magnetic resonance imaging)
Pathria grading of lumbar facet joint degeneration (by computed tomography)
Weishaupt grading of lumbar facet joint degeneration (by MRI and computed tomography)

The Thomson grading system is regarded to have more academic than clinical value.

Shoulder
The Samilson–Prieto classification is preferable for osteoarthritis of the glenohumeral joint.

Hip

The most commonly used radiographic classification system for osteoarthritis of the hip joint is the Kellgren–Lawrence system (or KL system). It uses plain radiographs.

Osteoarthritis of the hip joint may also be graded by Tönnis classification. There is no consensus whether it is more or less reliable than the Kellgren-Lawrence system.

Knee
For the grading of osteoarthritis in the knee, the International Knee Documentation Committee (IKDC) system is regarded to have the most favorable combination of interobserver precision and correlation to knee arthroscopy findings. It was formed by a group of knee surgeons from Europe and America who met in 1987 to develop a standard form to measure results of knee ligament reconstructions.

The Ahlbäck system has been found to have comparable interobserver precision and arthroscopy correlation to the IKDC system, but most of the span of the Ahlbäck system focused at various degrees of bone defect or loss, and it is therefore less useful in early osteoarthritis. Systems that have been found to have lower interobserver precision and/or arthroscopy correlation are those developed by Kellgren and Lawrence, Fairbank, Brandt, and Jäger and Wirth.

For the patellofemoral joint, a classification by Merchant 1974 uses a 45° "skyline" view of the patella:

Other joints
In the temporomandibular joint, subchondral sclerosis of the mandibular condyle has been described as an early change, condylar flattening as a feature of progressive osteoarthritis, and narrowing of the temporomandibular joint space as a late stage change. A joint space of between 1.5 and 4 mm is regarded as normal.

For the ankle, the Kellgren–Lawrence scale, as described for the hip, has been recommended. The distances between the bones in the ankle are normally as follows:
Talus - medial malleolus: 1.70 ± 0.13 mm
Talus - tibial plafond: 2.04 ± 0.29 mm 
Talus - lateral malleolus: 2.13 ± 0.20 mm

See also

WOMAC, a non-radiographic classification system of osteoarthritis, taking into account pain, stiffness and functional limitation.

References

Musculoskeletal radiographic signs
Arthritis
Medical scoring system